Stace is a surname and a given name, the latter sometimes as a diminutive of Stacy or Stacey.

Notable people with the name include:

Surname
 Aileen Stace (1895–1977), New Zealand craftswoman
 Arthur Stace (1884–1967), Australian religious graffiti artist
 Clive A. Stace (born 1938), British botanist and botanical author
 Helen McRae Stace (1850–1926), New Zealand school matron
 Walter Terence Stace (1886–1967), British philosopher and civil servant
 Wesley Stace (born 1965), British musician who uses the stage name John Wesley Harding

Given name

 Stace England, American musician
 Stace Victor Murray Clube (born 1934), English astrophysicist
 Stace Nelson (born 1967), South Dakota politician